Istrate or Eustratie is a Romanian given name and surname that may refer to
Given name
Eustratie Dabija (?–1665), Prince of Moldavia 
Istrate Micescu (1881–1951), Romanian lawyer 

Surname
Alexandru Istrate (born 1947), Romanian fencer
Nicolae Istrate (born 1982), Romanian bobsledder 

Romanian-language surnames
Romanian masculine given names